Metrowalk is a small but major commercial hub in Pasig in the Philippines. It is located on a  parcel of land at the junction of Ortigas and Meralco Avenues in the Ortigas Center central business district of the metro.

It occupies a large part of the  Payanig sa Pasig property that is claimed by numerous parties as a result of its 1986 sequestration by the Presidential Commission on Good Government (PCGG) as part of the Ill-gotten wealth of the Marcos family.

Payanig sa Pasig land dispute 

Metrowalk occupies a large part of the  Payanig sa Pasig property that is claimed by numerous parties as a result of its 1986 sequestration by the Presidential Commission on Good Government (PCGG) as part of the Ill-gotten wealth of the Marcos family. Ortigas & Company, Ltd. Partnership (OCLP) has disputed the PCGG's sequestration, claiming that then-president Ferdinand Marcos had forced them to sell the property against their will in 1968. On June 19, 2007, then-Governor of Ilocos Norte now a President Bongbong Marcos filed a motion to intervene in the OCLP v. PCGG case (Civil Case Number 0093) at the Sandinganbayan, the Philippines’ anti-graft court, and human rights victims from the period of Martial Law under Ferdinand Marcos have filed a suit noting that properties of the Marcoses should be made part of court-ordered reparations for the Marcos dictatorship's human rights victims. The PCGG considers the Payanig sa Pasig property the "crown jewel" among the properties sequestered from the Marcoses' ill-gotten wealth, estimating its minimum value to be about PHP16.5 billion in March 2015.

Other notable news coverage

2006 Leonardo Umale murder 
The area made national news when its ownership was noted as a possible motive for the murder of a businessman, Leonardo Umale in 2006.

2007 illegal casino allegations 
In January 2007, the leisure hub was subject to media scrutiny when an alleged illegal casino was said to be operating within the area limits. This was then denied by former Pasig mayor Vicente Eusebio. However, The Manila Times noted that the mayor's comment was an official statement.

References

External links

Shopping malls in Pasig
Ortigas Center